Ytterbium(III) acetate is an inorganic salt of ytterbium and acetic acid, with a chemical formula of Yb(CH3COO)3. It has colorless crystals that are soluble in water and can form hydrates.

Physical properties 
Ytterbium can form crystals and it is easily soluble in water. Its hydrates are in the form of Yb(CH3COO)3·nH2O  where n= 1, 4, 6.

Applications 
Ytterbium acetate can be used as a raw material for the synthesis of upconversion luminescent materials；it can also be used as a catalyst for some specific organic reactions.

References 

Acetates
Ytterbium compounds